Anthony Wilfred Bradley  (6 February 1934 – 20 December 2021) was a British barrister, academic and leading expert in UK constitutional law, social security and human rights.

Life and career
Bradley was born in Dover, Kent on 6 February 1934. He undertook an MA and LLM at Cambridge University.

He was professor of law at the University of Edinburgh and co-author (with Keith Ewing) of the leading textbook on Constitutional and Administrative Law. Bradley was a tenant at Cloisters Chambers in London, and died on 20 December 2021, at the age of 87.

Cases
R (Bancoult) v Secretary of State for Foreign and Commonwealth Affairs (No. 2) [2007] EWCA Civ 498
Chagos Islanders v The Attorney General & Her Majesty's Indian Ocean Territories Commissioner [2004] EWCA Civ 997

Publications
Books
Constitutional and Administrative Law (16th edn Pearson 2014) with KD Ewing

Articles
'Relations between the Executive, the Judiciary and Parliament - an evolving saga' [2008] Public Law 470

References

External links
Profile at Cloisters

See also
UK constitutional law
UK public service law

1934 births
2021 deaths
Academics of the University of Edinburgh
Alumni of the University of Cambridge
Honorary King's Counsel
British legal scholars
People from Dover, Kent